State Higher Vocational School in Tarnów (Państwowa Wyższa Szkoła Zawodowa w Tarnowie) – a public, vocational type university, created on the basis of the Council of Ministers of 19 May 1998 as the first university in Poland of a new type of vocational educating undergraduate and engineering.

The university operates under the Act of 26 June 1997 on higher vocational schools (Ustawa z dnia 26 czerwca 1997 roku o wyższych szkołach zawodowych), the statute and other regulations issued on its basis.

Institutes and specializations 
In 2012, the University offered studies, both full-time) and part-time, for licentiate (3 years) or engineering (3.5 years) for the sixteen specializations:

Institute of Humanistic
 Polish studies
 English studies
 German studies
 Romance studies

Institute of Mathematics and Natural Sciences
 Chemistry,
 Mathematics,
 Environmental protection,

Polytechnic Institute
 Electronics and telecommunication,
 Electrical engineering,
 Computer science,
 Materials science,

Institute of Administration and Economics
 Administration,
 Economics,

Institute of Health Protection
 Physical therapy,
 Nursing,
 Physical education,

Art Institute
 Graphics,
 Design.

National cooperation 
 AGH University of Science and Technology in Kraków
 Jagiellonian University in Kraków
 Bronisław Czech University School of Physical Education in Krakow
 Agricultural University of Kraków
 Jan Matejko Academy of Fine Arts in Kraków

International cooperation 
Università degli Studi di Trieste, Italy
 Pädagogische Akademie des Bundes, Vienna, Austria
 Université Sorbonne Nouvelle, Paris, France
 Université de Nantes, Nantes, France
 Haute École Blaise Pascal du Luxembourg (Belgium), in Bastogne, Belgium
 Haute École namuroise catholique, in Malonne, Belgium
 Universitatea Babeş-Bolya, Cluj-Napoca, Romania
 Hochschule Wismar, Germany
 Keski-Pohjanmaan Ammattikorkeakoulu – Mellersta Österbottens Yrkeshögskola Politechnika w Kokkola, Finland
 University of Naples Federico II, Italy
 Gaziantep Üniversitesi, Turkey
 Blackburn College, an Association of Lancaster University, England
 Università degli Studi di Urbino Carlo Bo (Italy).

Rectors of Higher Vocational School in Tarnow 
 Adam Juszkiewicz (1998-2007)
 Stanisław Komornicki (2007-2015)
 Jadwiga Laska (2015-2019)

References

External links 
 University website

Universities in Poland
Tarnów
1998 establishments in Poland
Educational institutions established in 1998